Ewelina Marcisz (born 2 February 1991) is a Polish cross-country skier. She competed in the World Cup 2015 season.

She represented Poland at the FIS Nordic World Ski Championships 2015 in Falun.

Cross-country skiing results
All results are sourced from the International Ski Federation (FIS).

Olympic Games

World Championships

World Cup

References

External links 
 

1991 births
Living people
Polish female cross-country skiers
Universiade medalists in cross-country skiing
People from Krosno
Cross-country skiers at the 2018 Winter Olympics
Olympic cross-country skiers of Poland
Universiade silver medalists for Poland
Universiade bronze medalists for Poland
Competitors at the 2015 Winter Universiade